The 6th European Athletics U23 Championships were held between 12 and 15 July 2007 in the Gyulai István Athletic Stadium in Debrecen, Hungary.

Results
Complete results and medal winners were published.

Men

Women 

†: In discus throw, Darya Pishchalnikova from Russia ranked initially 2nd (64.15m), but was disqualified for infringement of IAAF doping rules.

Medal table

Participation
According to an unofficial count, 851 athletes from 44 countries participated in the event.

 (1)
 (4)
 (1)
 (23)
 (13)
 (1)
 (9)
 (8)
 (10)
 (27)
 (8)
 (11)
 (24)
 (65)
 (60)
 (46)
 (25)
 (39)
 (3)
 (6)
 (14)
 (44)
 (14)
 (23)
 (2)
 (1)
 (1)
 (6)
 (1)
 (18)
 (17)
 (59)
 (19)
 (21)
 (72)
 (1)
 (4)
 (8)
 (7)
 (44)
 (28)
 (9)
 (10)
 (44)

References

General
Complete medal table

External links
Official site
Results

 
European Athletics U23 Championships
European Athletics U23 Championships, 2007
Athletics U23 Championships
International athletics competitions hosted by Hungary
2007 in youth sport
Sport in Debrecen